Hideaway is a 1937 American comedy film directed by Richard Rosson. Based on the 1937 play A House in the Country by Melvin Levy, the screenplay was written by J. Robert Bren and Edmund L. Hartmann. Produced and distributed by RKO Radio Pictures, it opened on August 13, 1937.  The film stars Fred Stone, Emma Dunn, Marjorie Lord and J. Carroll Naish.

Cast
 Fred Stone as Franklin Peterson
 Emma Dunn as Emma Peterson
 Marjorie Lord as Joan Peterson
 J. Carrol Naish as Mike Clarke
 William Corson as Bill Parker
 Ray Mayer as Eddie Baxter
 Bradley Page as Al Miller
 Paul Guilfoyle as Norris
 Tommy Bond as Oscar Peterson
 Dudley Clements as Sheriff Roscoe W. Wiggins
 Alec Craig as Jerry Nolan
 Charles Withers as Yokum
 Otto Hoffman as Hank
 Bob McKenzie as Walter Mooney

References

External links

1937 comedy films
1937 films
American comedy films
RKO Pictures films
American black-and-white films
American films based on plays
Films produced by Cliff Reid
Films directed by Richard Rosson
1930s American films